Shivlal Vekaria (born 29 April 1943, in Motavada in Rajkot district, Gujarat) is an Indian politician from the State of Gujarat.

He was elected to 9th and 10th Lok Sabha from Rajkot (Lok Sabha constituency) and was Secretary of Bharatiya Janata Party for Gujarat State.He has two sons.

References

1943 births
Living people
People from Rajkot district
India MPs 1989–1991
India MPs 1991–1996
Lok Sabha members from Gujarat
Bharatiya Janata Party politicians from Gujarat